Lisandro Moyano (born 11 July 1983) is a retired Argentine football striker.

References

1983 births
Living people
Footballers from Buenos Aires
Argentine footballers
Estudiantes de Mérida players
Trujillanos FC players
C.F. Monterrey players
Club San José players
C.S.D. Macará footballers
Deportivo Jalapa players
A.C.C.D. Mineros de Guayana players
Club Aurora players
Bolivian Primera División players
Association football forwards
Argentine expatriate footballers
Expatriate footballers in Venezuela
Argentine expatriate sportspeople in Venezuela
Expatriate footballers in Mexico
Argentine expatriate sportspeople in Mexico
Expatriate footballers in Bolivia
Argentine expatriate sportspeople in Bolivia
Expatriate footballers in Ecuador
Argentine expatriate sportspeople in Ecuador
Expatriate footballers in Guatemala
Argentine expatriate sportspeople in Guatemala